Alison Henrique Mira (born 1 December 1995, in Santa Cruz do Rio Pardo), simply known as Alison, is a Brazilian footballer who plays as a forward for Nova Venécia.

Career statistics

Honours
Atlético Goianiense
Campeonato Brasileiro Série B: 2016

References

External links
 
 

1995 births
Living people
Brazilian footballers
Brazilian expatriate footballers
Footballers from São Paulo (state)
Association football forwards
Campeonato Brasileiro Série A players
Campeonato Brasileiro Série B players
Campeonato Brasileiro Série C players
Associação Desportiva São Caetano players
Atlético Clube Goianiense players
Clube Náutico Capibaribe players
Mirassol Futebol Clube players
Sampaio Corrêa Futebol Clube players
Clube Atlético Votuporanguense players
Clube Atlético Tubarão players
Esporte Clube Novo Hamburgo players
Manaus Futebol Clube players
Joinville Esporte Clube players
Floresta Esporte Clube players
Pouso Alegre Futebol Clube players
J1 League players
Shonan Bellmare players
Brazilian expatriate sportspeople in Japan
Expatriate footballers in Japan